This is the discography of the American band Sly and the Family Stone.

Albums

Studio albums

Live albums

Charted compilation albums

Singles

Other charted songs

See also
 Sly Stone solo discography

Notes

References

External links
 Edwin & Arno Konings www.slystonebook.com

Sly and the Family Stone
Stone, Sly
Rhythm and blues discographies
Pop music group discographies
Funk music discographies